The New York Ballers were a basketball team based in New York City, New York. The team competed in the Junior Basketball Association (JBA), a league created for high school and junior college players as an alternative to the National Collegiate Athletic Association (NCAA).

History 
The JBA was first announced on December 20, 2017, when media personality LaVar Ball said to Slam magazine that he would create a professional league targeted at high school graduates and fully funded by his sports apparel company Big Baller Brand. The league held tryouts in New York City, New York in April 2018, at the Brooklyn Stuy Dome, selecting seven players for team's roster. The New York Ballers appointed Marvin McCullough, a former guard at Iona, as the team's first head coach.

Final roster

References

External links 
JBA official website

Junior Basketball Association teams
Basketball teams in New York City
Basketball teams in the United States
Basketball teams established in 2018